Mordellistena beyrodti is a beetle in the genus Mordellistena of the family Mordellidae. It was described in 1922 by Lengerken.

References

beyrodti
Beetles described in 1922